Mitsuo Harada (born 15 January 1964) is a Japanese professional golfer.

Harada played on the Japan Golf Tour, winning once.

Professional wins (2)

Japan Golf Tour wins (1)

Japan Challenge Tour wins (1)

Team appearances
World Cup (representing Japan): 1999

External links

Japanese male golfers
Japan Golf Tour golfers
Sportspeople from Tokushima Prefecture
1964 births
Living people